The 2014–15 season will be Dunaújváros PASE's 1st competitive season, 1st consecutive season in the Nemzeti Bajnokság I and 16th year in existence as a football club.

First team squad

Transfers

Summer

In:

Out:

Winter

In:

Out:

List of Hungarian football transfers summer 2014
List of Hungarian football transfers winter 2014–15

Statistics

Appearances and goals
Last updated on 9 December 2014.

|-
|colspan="14"|Youth players:

|-
|colspan="14"|Players no longer at the club:
|}

Top scorers
Includes all competitive matches. The list is sorted by shirt number when total goals are equal.

Last updated on 9 December 2014

Disciplinary record
Includes all competitive matches. Players with 1 card or more included only.

Last updated on 9 December 2014

Overall
{|class="wikitable"
|-
|Games played || 26 (17 OTP Bank Liga, 1 Hungarian Cup and 8 Hungarian League Cup)
|-
|Games won || 8 (3 OTP Bank Liga, 0 Hungarian Cup and 5 Hungarian League Cup)
|-
|Games drawn || 6 (5 OTP Bank Liga, 0 Hungarian Cup and 1 Hungarian League Cup)
|-
|Games lost || 12 (9 OTP Bank Liga, 1 Hungarian Cup and 2 Hungarian League Cup)
|-
|Goals scored || 36
|-
|Goals conceded || 45
|-
|Goal difference || -9
|-
|Yellow cards || 37
|-
|Red cards || 3
|-
|rowspan="1"|Worst discipline ||  Dávid Jakab (4 , 1 )
|-
|rowspan="1"|Best result || 6–1 (H) v Mezőkövesd – Ligakupa – 14-10-2014
|-
|rowspan="4"|Worst result || 0–3 (A) v Budapest Honvéd – OTP Bank Liga – 26-07-2014
|-
| 0–3 (A) v Videoton – OTP Bank Liga – 02-08-2014
|-
| 0–3 (A) v Újpest – OTP Bank Liga – 04-10-2014
|-
| 1–4 (H) v Videoton – OTP Bank Liga – 06-12-2014
|-
|rowspan="3"|Most appearances ||  Tamás Csehi (21 appearances)
|-
|  Zoltán Böőr (21 appearances)
|-
|  Márk Orosz (21 appearances)
|-
|rowspan="1"|Top scorer ||  Zoltán Böőr (7 goals)
|-
|Points || 30/78 (38.46%)
|-

OTP Bank Liga

Matches

Classification

Results summary

Results by round

Hungarian Cup

League Cup

Group stage

Knockout phase

References

External links
 Official Website
 UEFA
 fixtures and results

Dunaujvaros PASE